Qeshlaq-e Ganji (also Romanized as Qeshlāq-e Ganjī) is a village in Tarand Rural District, Jalilabad District, Pishva County, Tehran Province, Iran. At the 2006 census, its population was 414, in 90 families.

References 

Populated places in Pishva County